Maria Balcerkiewiczówna (21 December 1903 – 11 February 1975) was a Polish stage and film actress of the early 20th century.

Born in Warsaw, in 1921 she graduated from the C. Rino-Lupo film school, followed by a year of private acting lessons under the tutelage of Aleksander Zelwerowicz before making her stage debut on the theater stages of Warsaw in 1922, including stints at the National Theatre, Warsaw and the Grand Theatre, Warsaw. She made her film debut in the 1924 Edward Puchalski-directed O czym sie nie mówi, starring Jadwiga Smosarska.

From 1929 to 1931 she led her own acting troupe through the Polish provinces, bringing theater to small towns and villages, where she would also recite poetry. During World War II, Balcerkiewiczówna fled to London where she would settle permanently and became a member of the Association of Polish Artists (ZASP) while in exile. Proficient in nine languages, she spent her later years working as a translator. She died in London in 1975.

Filmography

References

External links

1903 births
1975 deaths
Polish stage actresses
Polish film actresses
Polish silent film actresses
Actresses from Warsaw
People from Warsaw Governorate
World War II refugees
Polish emigrants to the United Kingdom
20th-century Polish actresses